"Witch Doctor" is a 1958 American novelty song written and performed by Ross Bagdasarian, under his stage name David Seville. It became a number one hit and rescued Liberty Records from near-bankruptcy. In the song, the singer asks a witch doctor for romantic advice, the witch doctor responds with a nonsense incantation which creates an earworm.

Composition and recording 
Seville wrote the song, inspired by a book titled Duel with the Witch Doctor on his bookshelf. In the song, the narrator asks a witch doctor for advice on what to do because he has fallen in love with a girl, and the witch doctor replies with a gibberish line: "Oo-ee, oo-ah-ah, ting-tang, walla-walla bing-bang".

Seville had spent 200 dollars, a significant sum at that time, on a tape recorder, and he conceived of the idea of recording himself at different speed to create a dialogue between him and the witch doctor. He sang in his own voice as normal, and then overdubbed the song with the voice of the "witch doctor", which is in fact Seville's own voice sung slowly but recorded at half speed on the tape recorder, then played back at normal speed (the voice was therefore speeded up to become a high pitched squeaky one). Seville experimented with the process for a period of time before recording it in the studio, although it was said that when the executives from the financially-troubled Liberty label heard the resulting song, they released it to reach the shops within 24 hours.

The same technique used for creating the voice of the witch doctor was used in Seville's next song "The Bird on My Head", and then more significantly the highly successful Chipmunks (also known as Alvin and the Chipmunks) beginning with "The Chipmunk Song (Christmas Don't Be Late)" released for the Christmas of 1958. Initially released under David Seville alone, "Witch Doctor" was also released under the name of David Seville and the Chipmunks, and re-recorded under the name Alvin and the Chipmunks. The technique was also imitated by other recording artist such as Sheb Wooley in "The Purple People Eater", and The Big Bopper, who parodied  both songs on "The Purple People Eater Meets The Witch Doctor", which was originally released as a single but it was its flip-side "Chantilly Lace" that became the hit.

Chart performance 
The single was considered a major surprise hit on the chart, where it became Seville and Liberty Records' first  single, and stayed in the position for three weeks. The single had sold 1.4 million copies in the United States by December 1958. Billboard ranked it as the No. 4 song for 1958.

Charts

Alvin and the Chipmunks versions 
The song has gained further popularity due to multiple covers performed by Alvin and the Chipmunks. The first was for their 1960 album Sing Again with The Chipmunks, which would later be adapted into a musical segment on The Alvin Show. In 1983, they would perform this song on the Alvin and the Chipmunks episode "The Chipmunk Story" and the soundtrack Songs From Our TV Shows. The Chipmunk Adventure (1987) featured the song when sung by Mrs. Miller. The song was used for the opening of the 1990 TV special Rockin' Through the Decades in the style of various artists. In 1996, a dance mix cover was recorded for the album Club Chipmunk: The Dance Mixes.

In 2007, a DeeTown remix cover featuring Chris Classic was recorded for the live-action/CGI Alvin and the Chipmunks movie.  This version reached No. 62 on Billboard Hot 100 in January 2008. In 2012, they released a duet cover with the Chipettes entitled "Witch Doctor 2.0" available for digital download on the iTunes Store (although iTunes only credits the Chipmunks).

Cartoons version 

Danish band Cartoons covered "Witch Doctor" for their 1998 debut album, Toonage. A Spanish version and an Italian version both appear on the album Toontastic, while an Italian version also appears on the album More Toonage.

Track listings

Charts

Weekly charts

Year-end charts

Certifications

Release history

Other versions 
 Don Lang recorded a version similar to David Saville's recording.  This version reached No. 5 on the UK chart in June 1958.
The new wave band DEVO recorded a version for the soundtrack of The Rugrats Movie. Although the title, chorus and tune are the same, the verses were changed to be about how monkeys have more fun than humans, a fitting theme for both the film's monkey characters and DEVO itself.
Melinda Marx performed the song on her father Groucho Marx' television program You Bet Your Life.

References 

1958 debut singles
1998 singles
1958 songs
Alvin and the Chipmunks songs
Cartoons (band) songs
Novelty songs
Songs written by Ross Bagdasarian
Music published by Bourne Co. Music Publishers
Liberty Records singles
EMI Records singles
Bertelsmann Music Group singles
Universal Records singles
Warner Records singles
Billboard Top 100 number-one singles
Cashbox number-one singles
The Muppets songs